Geoff Merrick (born 29 April 1951) is an English former professional footballer who played as a central defender, making over 300 career appearances.

Career
Born in Bristol, Merrick played for Bristol City and Caroline Hill in Hong Kong.
A cultured defender, his best position was at centre-back, although he was also a capable full-back. Merrick was quick, good in the air and an exceptional reader of the game. These attributes led to at least two attempts from Arsenal to sign him, both of which were rejected by Bristol City.
As captain, Merrick was central to Bristol City's promotion to the top flight of English football in 1976. Having been part of this modern high-point for the club, he was unable to arrest its subsequent decline as they endured a series of relegations.
With financial difficulties accompanying the decline, Merrick became one of the legendary 'Ashton Gate Eight' who saved the club by ripping up their contracts and taking redundancy.

References

1951 births
Living people
English footballers
Bristol City F.C. players
Gloucester City A.F.C. players
English Football League players
Association football central defenders